The Netherlands-Indonesia Union was a confederal relationship between the Netherlands and Indonesia that existed between 1949 and 1956.

History
On 15 November 1946 the Linggadjati Agreement was signed between the Netherlands and the soon-to-be independent Dutch East Indies, which stated that the Dutch colonies would become an independent nation called 'the United States of Indonesia'. A Netherlands-Indonesian Union was established "to promote their common interests." Due to a military dispute, the execution of the agreement did not take place. After the Netherlands had signed a truce with the Republic of Indonesia, the transfer of sovereignty took place on 27 December 1949, and the Netherlands-Indonesia Union was founded.

The Union was abolished when Indonesia left in 1956.

Structure
The Netherlands-Indonesia Union would be a Dutch equivalent of the British Commonwealth. The Union would consist of two independent and sovereign partners:
the Kingdom of the Netherlands, consisting of
the Netherlands
Suriname
the Netherlands Antilles
Netherlands New Guinea
the United States of Indonesia (later Republic of Indonesia), comprising seven states.
The status of Netherlands New Guinea should be discussed further. Preliminarily, New Guinea remained under Dutch rule. And, where Suriname and the Antilles would be equal partners (federated states) in the Kingdom, New Guinea would remain a colony. The Head of the Union (Hoofd der Unie) would be Queen Juliana. The collaboration would take place in the following areas:
defense
foreign relations
finance
economic relations
cultural relations
To accomplish this, various organs would be created. Firstly, a conference of ministers had to be held every six months. Secondly, a permanent secretariat was established in The Hague. Each partner would choose a Secretary-General, who would each year take the leadership of the Secretariat. (From 1950 this was P. J. A. Idenburg for the Netherlands, who would remain such until the arrangement was dissolved in 1956.) Finally, there was a Union-Court of Arbitration set up to judge disputes between the Netherlands and Indonesia.

References

Sources
Nijhoffs Geschiedenislexicon Nederland en België, compiled by H.W.J. Volmuller in collaboration with the editors of De Grote Oosthoek, The Hague‑Antwerp 1981.

See also 
French Union
French Community
British Commonwealth

Former countries in Indonesian history
Former countries in Southeast Asia
New Imperialism
Indonesia–Netherlands relations